Muleege Hassan Maniku or Dhon Bandaarain was Sultan al-Ghazi al-Hasan 'Izz ud-din Sri Kula Ranmiba Danala Kirti Kattiri Buwana Maha Radun, proclaimed king of the Maldives in the year 1759. He was the first sultan of the Huraa dynasty.

Ali Raja's invasion in 1763
In the Malabar Coast Ali Raja Kunhi Amsa II had established a large and well armed fleet of Ketch's in the Indian Ocean, in his attempts to conquer islands that had withstood the Mughal Emperor Aurangzeb. The embarking fleet from Lakshadweep and Cannanore carried on board Sepoys and on its pennons the colors and emblems of Hyder Ali, captured the Maldives and enacted cruelties upon fellow Muslim's who inhabited the islands.

Soon, Ali Raja Kunhi Amsa II returned to Mysore and its port of Bangalore and arrived at Nagar in order to pay homage to Hyder Ali, who panicked in outrage when Ali Raja Kunhi Amsa II presented him the blinded and unfortunate Sultan of the Maldives Mukkaram Muhammad Imadu-din III. Hyder Ali ordered the deposition of the insane Ali Raja Kunhi Amsa II from the command of his fleet and begged forgiveness from Hasan 'Izz ud-din for the outrage committed by his guilty admiral. Hyder Ali was deeply afflicted by that event and after respectfully escorting and returning Hasan 'Izz ud-din to the Maldives, he withdrew from the palaces and sought solace in simplicity and hardly entrusted anyone whom he had given power and authority.

See also
Sultanate of Mysore
Hyder Ali
Arakkal kingdom

References

18th-century sultans of the Maldives
Year of birth unknown
Year of death unknown